Für immer ab jetzt is the third studio album by the German singer-songwriter Johannes Oerding. It was released by Columbia Records on January 11, 2013 in German-speaking Europe.

Track listing

Charts

Certifications and sales

References

2013 albums
Johannes Oerding albums